Matthew Hughes (born October 2, 1981, in Ludington, Michigan) is an American rower. He competed in the 2008 Olympics in men's quadruple sculls (as bow seat). Hughes graduated from the University of Michigan - Ann Arbor in 2004.

References

External links
 

Rowers at the 2008 Summer Olympics
Olympic rowers of the United States
1981 births
Living people
American male rowers
University of Michigan alumni
World Rowing Championships medalists for the United States